Ponderosa High School may refer to:

Ponderosa High School (California), Shingle Springs, California
Ponderosa High School (Colorado), Parker, Colorado